Two Thousand is the third studio album by the rock band French Kicks. It was released in 2006.

Track listing
 "So Far We Are" – 3:44
 "Also Ran" – 4:15
 "Cloche" – 4:26
 "Knee High" – 4:55
 "Keep It Amazed" – 5:19
 "No Mean Time" – 3:50
 "Basement: D.C." – 4:22
 "England Just Will Not Let You Recover" – 4:34
 "Hey I Wait I" – 3:11
 "Go On" – 3:16

References

External links
French Kicks official website

French Kicks albums
2006 albums
Vagrant Records albums
Albums produced by Doug Boehm